Agama mucosoensis, the Mucoso agama, is a species of lizard in the family Agamidae. It is a small lizard found in Angola.

References

Agama (genus)
Reptiles described in 1957
Taxa named by Walter Hellmich